John Baker (1769August 18, 1823) was an American politician who represented Virginia in the United States House of Representatives from 1811 to 1813.

Biography
Baker was born in 1769 in Frederick County in the Province of Maryland. He attended Washington College (now Washington and Lee University), Lexington, Virginia for three years. Later, he studied law. He was admitted to the bar and began practice in Berkeley County, Virginia (now Jefferson County, West Virginia).

Baker was a member of the Virginia House of Delegates, 1798–1799. He was one of the lawyers who defended Aaron Burr when he was tried for treason. He was elected as a Federalist to the Twelfth Congress (March 4, 1811 – March 3, 1813) with 56.44% of the vote, defeating Democratic-Republican Daniel Morgan. After leaving Congress, he resumed the practice of law. He was the Commonwealth attorney for Jefferson County. He died in Shepherdstown, Jefferson County, Virginia (now West Virginia) in 1823 and is buried in the Old Episcopal Church Cemetery.

External links

References

1769 births
1823 deaths
County and city Commonwealth's Attorneys in Virginia
People from Frederick County, Maryland
People from Shepherdstown, West Virginia
Virginia lawyers
Washington and Lee University alumni
Federalist Party members of the United States House of Representatives from Virginia
People of colonial Maryland
Burials in West Virginia